Footballer of the Year in Russia is an annual award given by Sport-Express daily to the Russian Premier League player of the season. The title is awarded according to the results of a poll conducted by the newspaper. 11 players of each Premier League club are polled.

Brazilian Daniel Carvalho became the first foreign player to win the award in 2005.

List of winners

See also
Footballer of the Year in Russia (Futbol), Futbol weekly magazine version
Soviet Footballer of the Year

External links
Sport-Express: 1991–2011 winners 
2011 winners 
Sport-Express: 2012–13 winners 

Russian Premier League trophies and awards

Russia
Awards established in 1991
1991 establishments in Russia
Annual events in Russia
Awards by newspapers
Association football player non-biographical articles